Frederick Gordon Brownell  (8 March 1940 – 10 May 2019) was a South African herald, vexillologist, and genealogist.

He designed the flags of Namibia and South Africa.

Family and early life

Brownell was born in Bethlehem, in what was then the Orange Free State province in South Africa on 8 March 1940.  He matriculated from St. Andrew's School in Bloemfontein in 1957.  He undertook his voluntary military service at the Air Force Gymnasium with 1 Motorboat Squadron (Air-Sea rescue) before going to Rhodes University in Grahamstown to read for a Bachelor of Arts degree in History and Social Anthropology, which he obtained in 1961.  He subsequently completed an Honours degree in history at the University of South Africa in 1965 and was awarded a Master of Arts degree (with distinction) from the same university in 1977 for a dissertation entitled "British Immigration to South Africa 1946 – 1970".

He married Christine de Villiers, whom he met whilst at Rhodes University, on 29 September 1962 in Pretoria and together they had three daughters.

Career 

Brownell joined the Department of Immigration on 2 January 1962 as an Administrative Officer.  His responsibilities included a tour of duty as Assistant Attache (Immigration) and Consul to the South African Embassy in London between 1965 and 1969.

He then joined the Department of National Education / later Arts, Culture, Science and Technology as Assistant State Herald in the Bureau of Heraldry on 1 August 1977. He was promoted to State Herald on 1 May 1982 and retired from that position in 2002.

Brownell designed many coats of arms, badges and flags, including the arms and the flag of Namibia in 1990. In 1993/1994, he designed the current South African flag, with a three-armed converging cross of the sort called a pall in heraldry, to symbolise the convergence of different cultures into one for the future South Africa. He later designed arms for the new provincial governments in South Africa. He was awarded the Order for Meritorious Service by President Nelson Mandela in 2000 for his role in the design of the South African flag and the Vexillon Award for excellence in the promotion of vexillology in 1995 and 2015, the only recipient to have won it twice.  He also published many articles and several books on heraldry and flags.  He was also involved in the field of honours and awards.

Final years and death

Shortly after his retirement Brownell and his wife moved to the Newlands Park retirement home, south east of Pretoria.  He continued to be an active member of the Southern African Vexillological Association and completed the SAVA Journal series on South African Military Colours (1664 to 26 April 1994).  Furthermore, in September 2015 he was awarded the degree of Doctorate of Philosophy (D.Phil) in the Faculty of Humanities at the University of Pretoria for a dissertation entitled Convergence and Unification: The National Flag of South Africa (1994) in Historical Perspective, based on the process of, and his role in, the designing the current South African flag.

In early 2019, he was diagnosed with pancreatic cancer. He died at his home surrounded by his family on 10 May 2019.

Awards and Commendations 
Brownell was the recipient of the following:

 Order for Meritorious Service (OMSS), Class II: Silver
 Southern Cross Medal (1975) (SM) and bar
 Military Merit Medal (MMM)
 General Service Medal
 Unitas Medal
 John Chard Decoration (JCD)
 Republic of Venda Police Star of Merit
 Republic of Venda Prison's Service Establishment Medal
 Knight of the Most Venerable Order of the Hospital of St. John of Jerusalem (KStJ)
 Cross of Merit of Robert Caluwe (instituted by the Heraldic Societies in the Baltic region for services to international heraldry)
 Gold Commemorative Medallion of the South West Africa Territory Force
 William Harvey Medal of the South African Blood Transfusion Service
 Archives News Literary Prize (1990)
 Vexillon Award of the International Federation of Vexillological Associations (1995 and 2015)
 Fellow of the International Federation of Vexillological Associations (FF)
 Fiat Lux Award by the family of St. Andrew's School (Bloemfontein) 
 South African National Defence Force Emblem for Voluntary Service
 Honorary Life Member of the Southern African Vexillological Association
 Laureate of the International Federation of Vexillological Associations (LF)

Publications 
Brownell's works include:

Books

 
 Nasionale en Provinsiale Simbole en Flora- en Fauna-embleme van die Republiek van Suid-Afrika, C. van Rensburg Publications. 1993 
 National symbols of the Republic of South Africa, Chris van Rensburg Publications, 1995
 
 
 
 Consolidated index to the South African Armorial (1989, 1990, 1992, 1997, 2001)
 Index to local and regional authorities which have registered arms, badges and seals with the Bureau of Heraldry (1990, 1991, 1997)
 Alphabetical index to South African Defence Force heraldic representations registered with the Bureau of Heraldry (1991, 1997, 2000)
 Names, Uniforms and Badges – a computerised record of the registrations under the Protection of Names, Uniforms and Badges Act, 1935, Vols. 1 – 4 (2000)

Journal articles and reports

 Report on the Transformation of National Orders in South Africa, co-authored with Dr Y Muthien and General L Moloi, 1998
 South African Military Colours – 1664 to 26 April 1994 Part II Vol.1 – Military Colours of the Union Defence Forces and of the South African Defence Force : 1 July 1912 to 30 May 1961, co-authored with Prof H H Smith, SAVA Journal SJ: 8/99, December 1999 
 South African Military Colours – 1664 to 26 April 1994 Part II Vol.2 – Military Colours of the Union Defence Forces and of the South African Defence Force : 1 July 1912 to 30 May 1961 : Colours devised for the Commandos of the South African Defence Forces prior to World War II, co-authored with Prof H H Smith, SAVA Journal SJ:9, July 2005 
 South African Military Colours – 1664 to 26 April 1994 Part III Vol. 1 – Military Colours of the South African Defence Force 31 May 1961 to 26 April 1994 : The National Colour and Colours devised for the South African Army, co-authored with Prof H H Smith, SAVA Journal SJ:10, June 2011 
 South African Military Colours – 1664 to 26 April 1994 Part III Vol. 2 – Military Colours of the South African Defence Force 31 May 1961 to 26 April 1994 : Colours devised for the South African Air Force, Navy, Medical Service and the South African Police, co-authored with Prof H H Smith, SAVA Journal SJ:11, December 2017 
 The Union Jack over Southern and Central Africa, 1795 – 1994, SAVA Journal SJ: 3/94, October 1994 
 Some Southern African Flags, 1949 – 1991, SAVA Journal SJ: 1/92, April 1992 
 Symbolism in the coats of arms of Special Schools for the Cerebral Palsied, in Education and Culture, II, 2, June 1978
 The Bureau of Heraldry, its establishment, functions and procedures, in Education and Culture, V, I, March/June 1982
 Heraldry in South Africa, in Optima, Vol. 32, 4, December 1984 (subsequently reprinted in The New Zealand Armiger, 18, December 1990)
 Finnish Influence on South African Heraldic Design, in the Proceedings of the 16th International Congress of Genealogical and Heraldic Sciences, Helsinki, 1984
 Historic Flags of South Africa, in the Report of the 11th International Congress of Vexillology, Madrid, 1985
 Heraldry in Natal, in Natalia, 17, December 1987
 New Southern African Flags, in the Proceedings of the 12th International Congress of Vexillology, 1987, published in The Flag Bulletin, XVIII, 1 – 4/130, Jan – Aug 1990
 The Evolution of the Coat of Arms and Flags of South West Africa and Namibia, published in 8 parts in Archives News, XXXII, 11 May 1990 – XXXIII, 6, December 1990
 Kruger Gray's bookplate for South Africa House, London, in Africana Society of Pretoria, Yearbook 8, 1990
 Symbols for Namibia, in The Flag Bulletin, XXXI, 1 – 2/145, Jan – April 1992
 Heraldic adaptation in the Southern African context, in Genealogica & Heraldica, the Proceedings of the 20th International Congress of Genealogical and Heraldic Sciences, Uppsala, 1992
 The flags of the Diggers' Republic, in Fahnen Flags Drapeaux, the Proceedings of the 15th International Congress of Vexillology, Zurich, 1993
 Some Bookplates in the Brenthurst Library, in Brenthurst Archives, I, 1, 1994
 The design of the new South African national flag, SABS Bulletin, XIII, 3, May/June 1994 (subsequently reprinted in the Journal of the Dental Association of South Africa, Vol. 49, II, November 1994)
  Creating an interim flag for South Africa, in The Flag Bulletin, XXXIII, 3/158, May – June 1994 (co-authored with B B Berry, D de Waal and T Stylianides)
 The evolution of a distinctive South African heraldic idiom, 1963–1996, in Genealogica & Heraldica, the Proceedings of the 22nd International Congress of Genealogical and Heraldic Sciences, Ottawa, 1996
 The Cartoonist's view of the South African National Flag, in Flags in Southern Africa and the World, the Proceedings of the 17th International Congress of Vexillology, Cape Town, 1997 
 The Seal of the Republic of South Africa – a little oversight?, in Arma (New Series), Vol. 4, 1–2, December 1998
 Flags of the Uniformed and other services in the former African 'Homelands' of South Africa, in Flags from Sea to Sea, the Proceedings of the 18th International Congress of Vexillology, Victoria, British Columbia, 1999

See also 

 Bureau of Heraldry, South Africa
 International Congress of Genealogical and Heraldic Sciences
 International Congress of Vexillology
 Southern African Vexillological Association

References

Sources

 Arma Vol 7 No 1 (2002)
 
 

1940 births
2019 deaths
Flag designers
Officers of arms
Rhodes University alumni
South African people of English descent
South African heraldists
South African heraldry
White South African people